Pomra is a village of Rangunia Upazila at Chittagong District in the Division of Chittagong, Bangladesh.

Geography
Pomra is located at

Education
There is one intermediate college in the village, Syeda Selima Qader Chowdhury Degree College. There is two secondary school, Pomara High School, founded in 1928 & Pomara Bangabandhu High School, founded in 1992. The madrasa education system includes one fazil madrasa, Pomra Jameul Ulum Fazil Madrasah.
pomra shahid zia nogor hogh school

See also
 List of villages in Bangladesh

References

Villages in Chittagong Division
Villages in Chittagong District